Events during the year 1957 in Northern Ireland.

Incumbents
 Governor - 	The Lord Wakehurst 
 Prime Minister - Basil Brooke

Events
1 January – Border Campaign: Seán South and Fergal O'Hanlon are killed in an Irish Republican Army attack on a Royal Ulster Constabulary barracks in Brookeborough, County Fermanagh. Following this, the Government of Ireland uses the Offences Against the State Act to intern most of the IRA's leadership.
12 January – Over 100 Irish republican suspects are arrested under the Civil Authorities (Special Powers) Act (Northern Ireland).
17 January – Aircraft carrier , laid down in 1943 at the Harland and Wolff Belfast shipyard as HMS Powerful, is commissioned into the Royal Canadian Navy.
30 September – Last day of operation of 97 miles (155 km) of railway in Northern Ireland (Great Northern Railway (Ireland) branches and the entire Sligo, Leitrim and Northern Counties Railway) following government instructions. Fermanagh loses all its lines.
undated – Cyril Lord opens a new factory for the production of tufted carpets at Donaghadee, County Down.

Arts and literature
Padraic Fiacc publishes Woe to the Boy.

Sport

Football
Irish League
Winners: Glenavon

Irish Cup
Winners: Glenavon 2 - 0 Derry City

Births
21 January – Terence Francis MacCarthy, genealogist, historian and writer.
3 March 
Mairéad Farrell, volunteer of the Provisional Irish Republican Army (killed by SAS soldiers during Operation Flavius 1988).
Patricia Lewsley, Social Democratic and Labour Party politician, Northern Ireland Commissioner for Children and Young People.
19 March – Patrick Joseph Kelly, Commander of the Provisional IRA East Tyrone Brigade (killed by Special Air Service at Loughgall 1987).
27 April – Jim Wells, Democratic Unionist Party MLA.
9 May – Billy Hamilton, footballer.
11 May – Mike Nesbitt, Ulster Unionist Party MLA.
23 May – Jimmy McShane, dancer and singer in Baltimora (died 1995).
4 August – Henry Cluney, rock guitarist.
16 August – Roberta Blackman-Woods, academic and politician.
29 August – Antoine Mac Giolla Bhrighde, Provisional Irish Republican Army volunteer (killed in armed confrontation with British troops 1984).
13 September – Mal Donaghy, footballer.
16 September – David McCreery, footballer.
30 November – Daniel McCann, volunteer of the Provisional Irish Republican Army (killed by SAS soldiers during Operation Flavius 1988).

Full date unknown
Séanna Walsh (Breathnach), volunteer of the Provisional Irish Republican Army.
Roy Walker, footballer and football manager.
1956/7 – Brian Gillen, member of the Belfast Brigade of the Provisional Irish Republican Army.

Deaths
29 April – Harry Midgley, Northern Ireland Labour Party member of the Parliament of Northern Ireland and alderman of Belfast (born 1893).
29 March – Joyce Cary, novelist and artist (born 1888).
1 August – Cathal O'Byrne, singer, poet and writer (born 1867).

See also
1957 in Scotland
1957 in Wales

References